Spur 57 is a state highway spur in Ward County, Texas. It is the former route of  US 80 between Pyote and Monahans.

Route description
The Spur 57 designation begins along the two-way westbound frontage road of I-20 west of the Pyote city limit. The route follows the roadway of former US 80 and parallels the Union Pacific Railroad to its north. Traveling eastward through Pyote, Spur 57 crosses SH 115, which provides access to I-20 at its exit 66, and passes through Wickett, where it intersects  FM 1219. The Spur 57 designation ends as it enters the county seat of Monahans; the roadway transitions into Business I-20 and continues into Monahans. A connection is also provided to I-20 via its exit 76.

History
A previous route designated Spur 57 was established in Montgomery County on September 25, 1939. This route provided a connection between  US 75 (now  SH 75) and Conroe. This route was extended through Conroe and back to US 75 on December 30, 1960, and was given the designation Loop 57. The route was truncated to  SH 105 and the designation was changed back to Spur 57 on May 1, 1980. The entirety of this route was removed from the state highway system on April 15, 1986.

The current Spur 57 was designated on August 28, 1991, as part of the cancellation of US 80 west of Dallas.

Major intersections

See also
List of state highway spurs in Texas
U.S. Route 80 in Texas

References

057
Transportation in Ward County, Texas
U.S. Route 80